CJRG-FM is a Canadian radio station that broadcasts at 94.5 FM in Gaspé, Quebec and airing a community radio format.

The station originally began broadcasting in 1978 at 93.3 FM, then moved to its current frequency in 1987.

CJRG is owned by Radio Gaspésie.

The station is a member of the Association des radiodiffuseurs communautaires du Québec.

Transmitters

Original callsigns CJRV-FM L'Anse-à-Valleau and CJRE-FM Rivière-au-Renard.

On March 3, 2011, the station received CRTC approval to add additional transmitters.

Grande-Vallée CJRG-FM-5 98.5 MHz
Petite-Vallée CJRG-FM-6 99.9 MHz
Cloridorme CJRG-FM-7 98.9 MHz

References

External links
Radio-Gaspésie
 

Jrg
Jrg
Jrg
Gaspé, Quebec
Radio stations established in 1978
1978 establishments in Quebec